The CRH5 Hexie (simplified Chinese: 和谐号; traditional Chinese: 和諧號; pinyin: Héxié Hào; literally: "Harmony") is an electric multiple unit high-speed train in use with China Railway High-speed in the People's Republic of China. The CRH5 is based on the ETR-600 New Pendolino used in Italy.

The CRH5 are non-tilting trains, developed for the Chinese Railways and whose technology has been transferred to local manufacturers.

Variants

CRH5A 
They were ordered around the same time as the Regina-based CRH1A and the Shinkansen-based CRH2A. These trains have been given the designation CRH5A. 30 additional sets were ordered in 2009 and 20 additional sets were ordered in 2010 to complete the current fleet operating on China's northern and eastern lines. On April 26, 2011, the MOR ordered an additional 30 sets.

As to the initial 60 sets, the first three were manufactured by Alstom's factory in Italy, and the next six were delivered in complete knock down form and assembled by CNR Changchun Railway Vehicle. The remaining 51 sets were built by CNR Changchun through technology transfer from Alstom.

The first train (CRH5-001A) departed from Savigliano port, Italy on December 11, 2006 and arrive at Dalian port on January 28, 2007. The first CRH5A set made by CNR Changchun (CRH5-010A) was delivered in April, 2007.

The CRH5A sets started service from April 18, 2007, the date of the sixth national railway speed-up at the Beijing-Harbin Railway. In the following years, it opened service at the Jinan-Qingdao high-speed rail and Shijiazhuang-Taiyuan high-speed rail.

Each of the CRH5A set consists of eight cars. The initial 12 sets (CRH5-001A ～ CRH5-012A) have one first-class seating car (ZY), six second-class seating cars (ZE), and one second-class seating/dining car (ZEC). The subsequent sets have two first-class seating cars (ZY) and six second-class seating cars (ZE).

The CRH5A trains experienced a number of failures in early stages. The failures were attributed to new technologies introduced on CRH5A and a relatively short trial run before the first delivery

CRH5E 

CRH5E are cold resistant high speed sleeper trains outfitted with traditional railway sleeping berths (couchette car).

CRH5G/H 

CRH5G is a specialized cold and sand/windstorm resistant version of the CRH5 for use on the Baoji–Lanzhou high-speed railway manufactured by CRRC Changchun Railway Vehicles.

CIT001

On April 2, 2007, China Academy of Railway Sciences ordered a CRH5-based high-speed test train; the official name of this train set is Code Zero Comprehensive Testing Train, name code CIT001. This train is equipped with special devices to monitor the condition of the track, wheel-rail force, overhead wire, communication system and signal system. The train is painted with yellow and white color and started test run on July 1, 2007.

Formation
Power Destination
 M – Motor car
 T – Trailer car
 C – Driver cabin
 P – Pantograph

Coach Type
 ZY – First Class Coach
 ZE – Second Class Coach
 ZYE – First Class／Second Class Coach
 ZEC – Second Class Coach／Buffet Car

CRH5A

  Train No.CRH5A-5001 to CRH5A-5012 and CRH5A-5043 to CRH5A-5053
  Train No.CRH5A-5013 to CRH5A-5042, CRH5A-5054 to CRH5A-5140 and CRH5G-5141 to CRH5G-5156

Distribution
:

See also

 China Railway CRH1
 China Railway CRH2
 China Railway CRH3
 China Railway CRH380A
 List of high-speed trains
 China Railway CRH6
 China Railway CIT trains
 New Pendolino
 Avant class 114
 Pendolino

References

Electric multiple units of China
Changchun Railway Vehicles
Alstom high-speed trains
Passenger trains running at least at 200 km/h in commercial operations
CRRC multiple units
High-speed trains of China
25 kV AC multiple units
Alstom multiple units
Passenger trains running at least at 250 km/h in commercial operations